Carl Ludwig Nietzsche (10 October 1813 – 30 July 1849) was a German Lutheran pastor and the father of the philosopher Friedrich Nietzsche.

Biography 
Carl Ludwig Nietzsche was born in Eilenburg, in the Kingdom of Saxony, in 1813, the same year as Richard Wagner, who later became a friend and patron of Friedrich Nietzsche. Carl's mother Erdmuthe Dorothea, née Krause (1778–1856), had been married to a court lawyer named Krüger in Weimar, at the same time as Goethe was living in the city, and witnessed the city's occupation by the French. Carl's father Friedrich Nietzsche worked as a pastor in Wohlmirstedt and as a superintendent in Eilenburg. From his father's first marriage, Carl Ludwig had seven half-siblings, one of whom later enjoyed success in England and would ultimately provide financial support to Friedrich Nietzsche. From his father's second marriage, Carl Ludwig had two sisters, Auguste and Rosalie, who would play a major role as aunts in Friedrich Nietzsche's childhood.

Following his father's example, Carl Ludwig studied theology in Halle, then worked as a tutor for the princesses at the ducal court in Altenburg. In 1842, at the order of king Frederick William IV of Prussia, he assumed the pastorship of the village of Röcken and moved into the rectory there, together with his mother and two unmarried sisters, of whom Auguste took charge of the household while Rosalie devoted herself to charitable endeavors.

In his son Friedrich's youth memoirs, written when he was only fourteen, he described his father as a cheerful and well-loved man, the "very picture of a country parson".

During a visit to his fellow clergyman David Ernst Oehler, the pastor of the neighboring parish of Pobles, Carl Ludwig met Oehler's youngest daughter Franziska. The young pastor made a strong impression on Franziska with his improvisations on the piano. They were married on his thirtieth birthday, 10 October 1843, when she was seventeen.

A little over a year into their marriage, they welcomed the birth of a son, who was christened Friedrich Wilhelm because the date coincided with the birthday of Carl Ludwig's royal benefactor.

In 1846 Carl Ludwig described his son in a letter:

 Brother Fritz is a wild boy, who can sometimes be controlled only by his Papa, inasmuch as the "rod" is never far from him; but now someone else helps more powerfully, and that is the dear Holy Christ, who has already taken hold of even little Fritz by head and heart, so that he wants to hear and speak of nothing but the heile Kist ["Holy Ghost"] - it's something very sweet.

However, the family recalls that young Friedrich was not controlled entirely by "rod" and sermonizing. His exuberance was also channeled into music-making, an activity which left a lifelong impression.

In 1846 a daughter named Elisabeth was born. She would later play a decisive but problematic role as administrator of the Nietzsche Archive, which would cause her brother's philosophy to be associated with German nationalism and antisemitism.

In 1848 a third child, Karl Ludwig Joseph, was born, but he died in 1850.

Late in the summer of 1848, Carl Ludwig Nietzsche was stricken by a serious illness, to which he succumbed: he died at age 35 on 30 July 1849. Friedrich Nietzsche lived in fear that his father's illness was an inheritable disease, and that he would some day suffer a similar fate. Carl Ludwig's cause of death has been conjectured to be a brain tumor or tuberculosis, and the possibility of a heritable illness has been the subject of much speculation. However, family members, especially Elisabeth Förster-Nietzsche, attributed the illness to a head injury resulting in concussion. To add support to this version of events, she falsified her brother's youth memoirs by expunging the phrase "My beloved father suddenly fell ill in September 1848" and replacing it with the sentence, "In September 1848 my beloved father suddenly became seriously ill as a result of a fall." More specifically, he was said to have tripped over a small dog which was underfoot, and fell down a stone stairwell onto pavement, which caused a concussion from which he died eleven months later.

On 2 August 1849, Carl Ludwig Nietzsche was buried in the village of Röcken. Less than a year later, his youngest son Joseph fell ill and died. Friedrich Nietzsche recorded a dream in which his father rose from the dead, claimed his younger brother, and returned to the grave.

Friedrich Nietzsche was barely five years old when his father died, so his father's role in his upbringing and intellectual development was very limited. In Nietzschean scholarship, however, he plays a major role in psychological and psychoanalytical interpretations, and as a representative of Pietist Protestantism which influenced his son's engagement with the Christian religion.

References 

1813 births
1849 deaths
Friedrich Nietzsche
19th-century German Lutheran clergy
People from Eilenburg